Zeke  is an American hardcore punk band from Seattle, Washington, formed in 1992. They are known for their extremely fast, energetic guitar sound. Zeke mixes this with strong influences from hard rock, and occasionally blues rock, and are often compared to Motörhead.

Zeke has released six full-length studio albums. Their first single, "West Seattle Acid Party", came out in 1992; after several album releases on indie label Scooch Pooch Records, they signed with Epitaph in 1998. They are currently signed to Relapse Records. They are featured in several soundtracks from video games such as the song "Death Alley" was on Tony Hawk's Pro Skater 4, the song "Long Train Runnin'" appeared on Tony Hawk's Underground 2, and "Kill the King" appeared on Tony Hawk's Project 8. Zeke appeared on the Project Gotham Racing 4 soundtrack. Zeke released a digital EP entitled Lords of the Highway in 2007. It includes the tracks "Lords of the Highway", "Kings and Queens" and "Hay Bailer", as well as a cover of GG Allin's "Die When You Die".

Zeke recorded Hellbender in 2017, 13 years after their last full LP Til the Livin' End.

Members
Guitar, vocals: Blind Marky Felchtone
Guitar: Jeff Hiatt
Bass: Jason Freeman
Drums: Donny Paycheck

Former members
Guitar: Abe Zanuel Riggs III, Dizzy Lee Roth, Chris Johnsen, Kyle Whitefoot
Bass: Jeff Matz, Mark Pierce, Kurt Kolfelt
Drums: Dayne Porras, Buzzy

Original members
Guitar, vocals: Blind Marky Felchtone
Guitar: Dizzy Lee Roth
Bass: Mark Pierce
Drums: Donny Paycheck

Discography
Super Sound Racing (IFA, 1994) (Scooch Pooch (reissue), 1995) (Relapse (reissue) 2008)
Flat Tracker (Scooch Pooch, 1996) (Relapse (reissue) 2008)
PIG (live 7"), (Man's Ruin, 1997)
Kicked in the Teeth (Epitaph, 1998)
True Crime (Dropkick, 1999)
Pinstriping the Dutchman's Coffin: Von Dutch Tribute (1999)
Dirty Sanchez (Epitaph, 2000)
Death Alley (Aces and Eights, 2001)
Live and Uncensored (live album, 2003)
Til the Livin' End (Relapse, 2004)
Split 7" w/ Disfear (Relapse, 2004)
Split CD & 10" w/ Peter Pan Speedrock (Bitzcore, 2005)
Lords of the Highway (Digital release and 7") (Relapse, 2007)
Hellbender (Relapse, 2018)

Compilations
 Contaminated VI
 We're a Happy Family: A Tribute to Ramones
 Mad Mike Jones Presents Mototrax 1
 How We Rock
 Alpha Motherfuckers: A Tribute to Turbonegro
 Free the West Memphis 3: A Benefit For...
 Punk-O-Rama Vol. 5
 Serial Killer Compilation
 Free Air Festival
 A Fistful of Rock 'N Roll Vol. 1
 Built for Speed: A Motörhead Tribute
 Of Things to Come (soundtrack)
 Punk-O-Rama Vol. 4: Straight Outta the Pit
 Punk-O-Rama Vol. 3
 Goin' After Pussy: Teasers & Tidbits
 Live at the Colourbox Vol. 2
 Pogo, Strut, Slam, Swivel & Mosh
 Scooch Pooch Plays: Their Original Sins

References

External links
Official website
[ Zeke] at AllMusic

Hard rock musical groups from Washington (state)
Hardcore punk groups from Washington (state)
Epitaph Records artists
Relapse Records artists
Musical groups established in 1992
Punk blues musical groups